Stacy is an unincorporated community located in Perry County, Kentucky, United States. It was also called Rowdy. The Rowdy post office  closed in 2011.

References

Unincorporated communities in Perry County, Kentucky
Unincorporated communities in Kentucky